Fort Misery is a ghost town situated in Yavapai County, Arizona, United States.

References

External links
 
 

Populated places in Yavapai County, Arizona
Ghost towns in Arizona